Aspen Beach Provincial Park is a provincial park in Alberta, Canada, located 17 km west of Lacombe on Highway 12, a short drive off Highway 2.

Established in 1932, Aspen Beach Provincial Park was the first provincial park in Alberta. The parkland reserve and recreational area contains sand beaches on the southern shores of Gull Lake, which is suitable for swimming and paddling due to its warm shallow waters.

See also
List of Alberta provincial parks
List of Canadian provincial parks
List of National Parks of Canada

External links
Park page at Alberta Government site

Lacombe County
Provincial parks of Alberta